A snake pit is, in a literal sense, a hole filled with snakes. In idiomatic speech, "snake pits" are places of horror, torture and death in European legends and fairy tales. The Viking warlord Ragnar Lodbrok is said to have been thrown into a snake pit and died there, after his army had been defeated in battle by King Aelle II of Northumbria. An older legend recorded in Atlakviða and Oddrúnargrátr tells that Attila the Hun murdered Gunnarr, the King of Burgundy, in a snake pit. In a medieval German poem, Dietrich von Bern is thrown into a snake pit by the giant Sigenot – he is protected by a magical jewel that had been given to him earlier by a dwarf.

See also
 Narcisse Snake Pits

References

Snakes
Torture
Execution equipment
Criminal homicide